Theodotos I Kassiteras, Latinized as Theodotus I Cassiteras (died January 821) Ecumenical Patriarch of Constantinople from 1 April 815 to January 821.

Theodotos was born in Nakoleia, as the son of the patrikios Michael Melissenos by the sister of Eudokia, the last wife of Emperor Constantine V. Theodotos had become attached to the court bureaucracy and was a confidant of Emperor Michael I Rangabe. 

By the time Michael I was deposed by Leo V the Armenian in 813, Theodotos was an elderly spatharokandidatos, whom the near-contemporary Scriptor Incertus describes as "meek" and "uneducated". On 14 March 815, Leo forced the resignation of Patriarch Nikephoros I, and appointed the pro-iconoclast Theodotos Melissenos in his place.  Later in 815, the new patriarch presided over a Church council in Constantinople, which overturned the Second Council of Nicaea and reinstated the ban on the veneration of icons, thus beginning the second period of Byzantine Iconoclasm. Much of the Iconoclast effort in the council was driven by other clerics, including the later Patriarchs Antony I and John VII. In the aftermath of this synod Theodotos is representing as torturing by starvation at more than one iconodule abbot in an attempt to force them into agreement with his ecclesiastical policy.

He ceases to be mentioned in the sources after the murder of Leo V and accession of Michael II the Amorian in December 820.

References

Sources
 
 
 

9th-century patriarchs of Constantinople
Byzantine Iconoclasm
Melissenos family